Amity Renae Dry is an Australian singer-songwriter and a reality show contestant.

Early career
At just five years of age she started studying music and piano and performing on stage. She began writing original songs when she was twelve and was accepted into a performing arts school at sixteen.

The Block
Amity got her big break after appearing on the Nine Network reality show The Block alongside her husband Phil Rankine in 2003.

Four couples, including Dry and Rankine, lived in and renovated a run down apartment block. When they had finished, the apartments were auctioned off individually, and the couples got whatever money they made over the reserve price.

Dry and her husband Phil Rankine appeared on the 2013 series of The Block: All Stars and were the winners.

Music career

Through the exposure of her talents on the show, Amity gained a record contract and released the album The Lighthouse during the media promotion for the show. It debuted at number eight on the ARIA album charts. The only song released as a CD single was "Start of Something New".

After taking a break from the music scene, she returned in 2005 with an independently released album True to Me.

She has written a musical play entitled "Mother, Wife and the Complicated Life" in which she performs with three other women.

Personal life
Amity was married to Phil Rankine and they have two children, born in 2006 and 2010. The couple divorced in 2018.

Discography

Albums

Charting singles

References

External links 
 Amity Dry Official Site

1978 births
Living people
Australian women singer-songwriters
Participants in Australian reality television series
21st-century Australian singers
21st-century Australian women singers